The Mississippi Gulf Coast Classic was a golf tournament on the Nike Tour from 1990 to 1997. It was played at the Windance Country Club in  Gulfport, Mississippi from 1990 to 1995 and at the Mississippi National Golf Club in Gautier, Mississippi from 1996 to 1997.

Winners

Bolded golfers graduated to the PGA Tour via the final Nike Tour money list.

See also
Mississippi Gulf Coast Open - a later Mississippi Gulf Coast tournament

Notes

References

External links
Windance Country Clubb official site
Mississippi National Golf Club official site

Former Korn Ferry Tour events
Golf in Mississippi
Recurring sporting events established in 1990
Recurring sporting events disestablished in 1997
1990 establishments in Mississippi
1997 disestablishments in Mississippi